Andrea Costa (born 1 February 1986) is an Italian football coach and a former player who played as a defender or midfielder. He is the coach of Under-17 squad of Reggiana.

Club career

Reggiana
Costa started his career at hometown club Reggiana of Serie C1.

Bologna
He was signed by Bologna in summer 2003 in co-ownership deal, but reported to squad in January 2005, which he already made 16 appearances for Reggiana.

After Bologna relegated in summer 2005, he entered the first team and played 43 Serie B games. Bologna also acquired Costa outright from bankrupted Reggiana in the same summer.

Reggina
On 31 January 2008, he was signed by Serie A team Reggina, located in Reggio Calabria, for €100,000 loan fee. In June 2008, Reggina bought him outright for an additional €2.75 million transfer fee.

Sampdoria
On 3 August 2011 he was signed by U.C. Sampdoria on a temporary basis for a loan fee of €1.9 million. On 3 July 2012 he was signed in a definitive deal for another €1.1 million on a 4-year contract.

Parma
On 27 August 2014 Costa joined Parma with Marco Marchionni moved to opposite direction. Both players were valued for €2 million fee. Costa became a free agent in June 2015, after the bankruptcy of the club.

Empoli
Costa signed a three-year contract with Empoli on 21 July 2015. He left Empoli after the club relegated at the last round of 2016–17 Serie A season.

Benevento
On 13 July 2017, he agreed to join newly promoted Benevento from Empoli on a two-year contract.

Reggio Audace
On 27 August 2019, he joined Serie C club Reggio Audace on a 3-year contract.

International career

References

External links

gazzetta.it  
 Lega Serie A profile 

Italian footballers
A.C. Reggiana 1919 players
Bologna F.C. 1909 players
Reggina 1914 players
U.C. Sampdoria players
Parma Calcio 1913 players
Empoli F.C. players
Benevento Calcio players
Serie A players
Serie B players
Association football defenders
Italy youth international footballers
Sportspeople from Reggio Emilia
1986 births
Living people
Footballers from Emilia-Romagna